Dycladia transacta is a moth of the subfamily Arctiinae. It was described by Francis Walker in 1856.

References

Euchromiina
Moths described in 1856